The Woodstock Stakes is a historic Canadian Thoroughbred horse race run annually at Woodbine Racetrack in Toronto, Ontario since 1885. Held in mid April, the sprint race is open to three-year-old horses and is contested over a distance of five and a half furlongs on Polytrack synthetic dirt. It currently offers a purse of $97,488.

Inaugurated in 1885 at the now defunct Old Woodbine Race Course in Toronto, over the years the Woodstock Stakes has been contested at a variety of distances:
  miles : 1885–1917 at Old Woodbine Race Course
  miles : 1920–1932 at Old Woodbine Race Course
 1 mile 70 yards : 1939–1941 at Old Woodbine Race Course
 7 furlongs : 1976 at Greenwood Raceway
  furlongs : 1967–1975 and 1977–1993 at Fort Erie Racetrack, 1994–1997 at Greenwood Raceway
 6 furlongs : 1948–1955 at Old Woodbine Race Course, 1956–1966 and 1998–present at Woodbine Racetrack

Records
Speed  record: 
 1:08.22 - Town Prize (2012) (at current distance of 6 furlongs)

Most wins by an owner:
 3 - Joseph E. Seagram (1895, 1896, 1907)
 3 - Sam-Son Farm (1973, 1974, 1986)
 3 - Kinghaven Farms (1981, 1988, 1991)

Most wins by a jockey:
 4 - David Clark (1979, 1980, 2000, 2005)

Most wins by a trainer:
 3 - Arthur H. Warner (1968, 1973, 1974)
 3 - Roger Attfield (1988, 1991, 1993)

Winners of the Woodstock Stakes since 1989

Earlier winners

1988 - Sweeping Change
1987 - Bold Revenue
1986 - Color Me Smart
1985 - Quick Raise
1984 - John Bright
1983 - Parfaitement
1982 - Ariva
1981 - Bude
1980 - My Only Love
1979 - Ocala Noir
1978 - Buck Mountain
1977 - Regal Sir
1976 - Salim Alicum
1975 - Big Destiny
1974 - Runnin Roman
1973 - Don't Ask Me That
1972 - Jewel Prince
1971 - Coco la Terreur
1970 - Kamakura
1969 - Sailor Conn
1968 - Big Blunder
1967 - Pine Point
1966 - Stevie B. Good
1965 - Whistling Sea
1964 - Royal Tara
1963 - Shy Bride
1962 - Roman Anna
1962 - Monarch Park
1961 - Three M. R.
1961 - Kickimoon
1960 - Hidden Treasure
1959 - Wonder Where
1958 - Silver Ship
1957 - Lyford Cay
1956 - Orchestra
1955 - Little Wolf
1954 - Omyboy
1953 - Please Pat
1952 - Tiny Terry
1951 -  no race
1950 - Everness
1949 - Elmwood Paid
1948 - Pet Shadow
1942–1947 : no race
1941 - Grano Saltis
1940 - Second Helping
1939 - Sir Marlboro
1933–1938 : no race
1932 - Springsteel
1931 - Rideaway
1930 - Gold Brook
1929 - Brown Wizard
1928 - Solace
1927 - Roi des Montagnes
1926 - Punjab
1925 - Jude Fuller
1924 - Digit
1923 - Eulalia
1922 - Star Jester
1921 - Star Voter
1920 - Master Bill
1918–1919 : no race
1917 - Fruit Cake
1916 - Damrosch
1915 - Commonada
1914 - David Craig
1913 - Kleburne
1912 - Light O'M' Life
1911 - Zeus
1910 - Banives
1909 - Guy Fisher
1908 - Montclair
1907 - Main Chance
1906 - Ruth W.
1905 - Tongorder
1904 - Fort Hunter
1903 - Claude
1902 - Red Robe
1901 - Sannazarro
1900 - Advance Guard
1899 - Gold Car
1898 - Nabob
1897 - Boanerges
1896 - Eulalon
1895 - Silk Gown
1894 - Blue Garter
1893 - Coquette
1892 - Lady Superior
1891 - Addie B.
1890 - Periwinkle
1889 - Blesdoe
1888 - Banjo
1887 - Lady Dayrell
1886 - Shamrock
1885 - Curtolima

 In 1957 Pink Velvet finished first but was disqualified and set back to second.
 In 1961 there was a dead heat for first.

References
 Woodbine Racetrack
 Woodstock Stakes at Pedigree Query

Ungraded stakes races in Canada
Flat horse races for three-year-olds
Recurring sporting events established in 1885
Woodbine Racetrack
1885 establishments in Ontario